Krasnoznamensky is a rural locality (a settlement) in Krasnoznamensky Selsoviet, Kuryinsky District, Altai Krai, Russia. The population was 77 as of 2013. There is 1 street.

Geography 
Krasnoznamensky is located 8 km north of Kurya (the district's administrative centre) by road. Novoznamenka is the nearest rural locality.

References 

Rural localities in Kuryinsky District